Rutobwe was a commune located in Gitarama, Rwanda.

References 

Former subdivisions of Rwanda